Macaduma bipunctata is a moth of the subfamily Arctiinae. It was described by George Thomas Bethune-Baker in 1904. It is found in New Guinea.

References

 Natural History Museum Lepidoptera generic names catalog

Macaduma
Moths described in 1904